Pius Mayanja known by his stage name Pallaso is a Ugandan recording artist, songwriter, producer and videographer. He sings in Luganda, mixes with English and sometimes Kiswahili. His music genre specialty is Afrobeats, Hip hop, Dancehall, Afropop, and RnB. His musical journey started back in 2000 when he started out at Leone Island, a musical group owned by his older brother, Dr. Jose Chameleone. He later moved to the US, where he lived for 10 years, before returning to Uganda in 2014. Upon his return, he set out to establish his now very celebrated musical career, and formed the group, "Team Good Music" which seems to be working well in the Uganda Music Industry.

Early life 
Pallaso was born on 5 September 1987 at Mulago Hospital to Mr. Gerald Mayanja and Ms. Prossy Mayanja. He is one of seven children born to the couple. The family spent most of their early years in Kawempe, a Kampala suburb. Pallaso comes from a musical family with three of his brothers (Chameleon, Weasel and the late AK47 Mayanja) running reputable musical careers in Uganda.

Music career 
Pallaso begun his musical career under the musical group, Leone Island, and went under the stage name, Lizard.  His first single was Mudigidde in 2003 which was produced by his brother Dr. Jose Chameleone. The song had massive airplay and crowd reception, having been played first on Radio Simba by Bobo King and Omulangira Ndawusi.

In 2004 Pallaso left Uganda and started working in United States where he also continued with his music career. While in America, he re-branded himself from Lizard to Pallaso from his real name Pius. While residing in Lewiston, Maine, he collaborated with a local rapper known as The Mess. Together they collaborated on a joint album titled Change released in 2013.

In 2014, Pallaso teamed with Shaggy and DJ Hidrro they released the song "Remain in Our Hearts" which was dedicated to the fallen heroes mainly Michael Jackson, Bob Marley and The Notorious B.I.G.

Later that year Pallaso returned to Uganda and begun his musical journey with a collabo with Goodlyfe Crew titled "Amaaso".The song became a chart topper and was featured on various TV and Radio musical charts for several weeks. Pallaso later worked on several solo musical projects including "Wekoledewo kaki", "Omugongo" and many others.

He then teamed up with Ugandan artiste, Sheebah Karungi and begun the musical group, Team No Sleep, with prominent musical manager, Jeff Kiwa coming on board as the group's manager. The Team No Sleep group would later be joined by the likes of King Saha, Ak47 and other rising musicians.

Together with Sheebah, the duo released their first single "Mundongo", followed by "Go Down Low" which won the HiPipo Music Awards as Best Afro Pop Song 2015. Pallaso later co-produced the single "Tamale Mirundi" with King Saha and several other singles which include "Kilabe embaliga" and "Sanyu lyange", which was a remake of a classic by another Ugandan artiste, Sweet Kid.

In November 2014, he started working on a collaboration with the Nigerian musician Davido for the single "Twatoba", which was released in January 2015. He released it alongside his other 2015 songs which include "Ffe tuliko", "Tiwa Savage", "Mubambazanga", "Tebakusobolola" and many others. On 19 May 2015, Pallaso left Team No Sleep to form his independent group, Team Good Music.

Personal life 
He is a young brother to Jose Chameleone. Pallaso is a father to two children, a girl named Maisha Mayanja and a boy Dinari Mayanja He was on a police hunt for having fled from them with the handcuffs on after he was arrested for not abiding by the COVID-19 social distancing rules.

Pallaso was attacked by an angry mob in Johannesburg, South Africa. He was reportedly hit with stones and cut with pangas. He had gone there to shoot a new video for one of his songs.

Awards

Discography

Live
Pallaso Live Club Beats Online Concert (21 December 2020)

Album
 "Mama" (August 28, 2016)

Singles
 "Move Your Body" (14 April 2013)
 "Change" (with The Mess) (17 May 2013)
 "No More" (with Dirty Boy Raw) (23 May 2013)
 "It's Cold" – (Tribute to Ayla Reynolds (3 September 2013)
 "Follow Me" (with The Mess) (26 September 2013)
 "Amaaso" (Radio & Weasel feat. Pallaso & The Mess) (23 October 2013)
 "Home" (with The Mess) (21 December 2013)
 "Mundongo" (with Sheebah) (28 March 2014)
 "Wekoledewo Kaki" (13 June 2014)
 "Go Down Low" (with Sheebah) (12 August 2014)
 "Pray For Me" (7 October 2014)
 "Tamale" (with King Saha) (16 September 2014)
 "Ntwala" (with Spilla) (17 October 2014)
 "Sanyu Lyange" (13 November 2014)
 "Very Sorry" (4 December 2014)
 "Twatoba" (feat. Davido) (25 February 2015)
 "Koona" (feat. Spice Diana) (14 June 2015)
 "Malamu" (2020)
 "Ani Oyo" (2020)
 "Nalonda Nemala" (2021)
 "Mpa Love" (2021)
 "Bega Bega" (2022)

Others
 "Mudigidde"
 "Omugongo"
 "Nyola"
 "Tebakusobola"
 "Mubambazanga"
 "AKOLO"
 "Tiwa Savage"
 "Ffe Tuliko"
 "Nze Ani"
 "Sweet Love"
 "Sipiyo"
 "Onfitinya"
 "Kirabe embaliga"
 "Yes We Can"
 "My Gurly Gurly"
 "Move Ya Body"
 "African Tears"
 "No Answers"
 "Birthday"
 "Ready For You"
 "Never Came Clean"
 "My Girl"
 "Believe in Me"
 "Omusawo"
 "Ndikuwaki" (2021)
 "Bareke Abo" (2022)
 "Katonda" (2022)
 "Sherry" (2022)
 "Zari" (2022)

References

External links
Official Website
Team Good Music

21st-century Ugandan male singers
1987 births
Living people
Ugandan songwriters